Conasprella geeraertsi is a species of sea snail, a marine gastropod mollusc in the family Conidae, the cone snails, cone shells or cones.

This snail is predatory and venomous and is capable of "stinging" humans.

Description

Distribution
This marine species of cone snail occurs off the Philippines.

References

 Poppe G.T. & Tagaro S.P. (2017). New Conidae from the central Philippines. Visaya. 4(6): 5-18. page(s): 9, pl. 4
 Poppe G.T. (2019). About the Conidae from the Mactan Channel and related species. Visaya. 5(2): 49-53.

geeraertsi
Gastropods described in 2017